Andreas Almgren (born 12 June 1995) is a Swedish track and field middle-distance runner. On 27 July 2014, he won the bronze medal at the 800 metres event at the World Junior Championships in Eugene, Oregon, United States.

Achievements

References

External links
 

1995 births
Living people
Swedish male middle-distance runners
World Athletics Championships athletes for Sweden
Athletes (track and field) at the 2016 Summer Olympics
Olympic athletes of Sweden
21st-century Swedish people